Felipponea is a genus of freshwater snails that have a gill and an operculum, aquatic gastropod mollusks in the family Ampullariidae, the apple snails.

Species 
The genus Felipponea includes 3 species:
 Felipponea elongata (Dall, 1921)
 Felipponea iheringi (Pilsbry, 1933)
 Felipponea neritiniformis (Dall, 1919) - type species (synonym: Felipponea neritiformis (Dall, 1919))

References 

Ampullariidae